This is a list of characters from Kiddy Girl-and is a 2009 sequel to the science fiction anime series Kiddy Grade.

Characters

Main characters

The protagonist of the series, born August 10, SC0363 (Star Century 0363). Relative to the series' predecessor Kiddy Grade, she retains elements of Éclair's personality: her recklessness and simple nature, in addition to being spastic and childish. While she and Q-feuille are ES member candidates, they are currently waitresses for the Touch & Go! cafe within the GTO headquarters. She is also known to have a strong love for pumpkin pudding, to the point she would break into the GTO to get some. Her special ability, "Push-Pull," is teleportation. She has inherited Trixie's ability to bend space. While powered-up by Di-air's kiss she is able to teleport further, faster and while carrying multiple bodies, however later on has shown she has gotten stronger with her ability to where she doesn't need to kiss Di-air to teleport other people. Her name is French for "have heart", shown where her pigtails are formed into the shape of small hearts. It is later revealed that her real name is Lieselotte and that Geacht'er is her biological brother, as they share the same rose birthmark, the thought of which has cause her to be very depressed. In episode 21, she freed Q-feuille from her brainwashed state through resonance amidst a kiss. (The resonance was strong enough to overpower "Geact'er's" ability.) In that same episode, Ascoeur's past was revealed. She, as Lieselotte, was a member of the Nouvlesse and was imprisoned with her brother in an experimental facility when the universe was to become a democracy; members of the Rosenburg family who committed genocide rather than be ruled under the commoners. When their powers first manifested right before she was about to be crushed, she ended up in a cryogenic chamber and was separated from her brother, however lost all of her memories up till that point.

Her official date of birth is September 21, SC0372. She has qualities reminiscent of Lumière: her intelligence and serious nature, in addition to a heightened sensitivity to embarrassment.  She also is an anime otaku, particularly of a Cardcaptor Sakura parody show, Card Getter Sakura. Like Ascoeur, she is an ES member candidate, but currently works as a waitress for the Touch & Go! cafe. Her special ability, "Parfum," is foresight, but is seldom used as it seems to be weak, leading her to rely on small Chocolate Bombs, small but powerful bombs that look like chocolate treats. However, with Di-air's kiss she is able to predict actions with precision. She has inherited Troisienne's ability to stop time. Though she should be sixteen-years-old, she reveals to Di-air that she is seven-years-old, like Di-air. Her name is from the French "Quatre Feuille" or "Four leaf", as in clover. It is later revealed that she was created only seven years ago by Eclipse, the former director of the GOTT, who died in the process. Later after overusing her Time Ability, she lost all of her memories and currently with the G Society. Shade later brainwashes her into believing she is Geacht'er's little sister.  In episode 18, it is shown that Q-feuille's full name is Quatre Feuille IV Lumière; Eclipse, the former GTO director had planned to clone Éclair and Lumière she made three successful generations, but after creating Q-feuille with her quantum abilities Eclipse reached her limit and died leaving Q-feuille without a partner and no fourth generation of Éclair clones.

While brainwashed, she takes up a more spoiled child like personality, and always likes to be pampered by her "onii-chan". She also refers to herself in the third person.

She is a seven-year-old girl recruited as an ES member candidate, apprenticing under Ascoeur and Q-feuille. Her past is shrouded in a mystery even she does not know, but is implied it was a life of perpetual darkness. Although her hair seems adorned by red hair clips similar to that of Chi from Chobits which she can twitch them at will like ears. Her special ability allows her to increase the magnitude of other people's abilities, through a lips-to-lips kiss. She later displays the ability to both use Time and Space manipulation, how has yet been explained, though with her age it is believed she could be the reincarnation or clone of former GOTT director Eclipse.

 A pocket-sized, lime-green creature whom befriends Di-air and terrorizes Ascoeur and Q-feuille when the trio are assigned to investigate the ruins of the GOTT headquarters. With Di-air's kiss, he was able to gather remnants of nanotechnology to shape-shift into a Genetech Beast. The trio bring him back to the GTO headquarters where Di-air wears him as a pochette. Though they omit his presence from the debriefing, Hiver knows and does not disapprove. He seems to have taken up the position of being Di-air's bodyguard, purposely kissing her to change into a GENETECH turtle to protect her from an attack.

Supporting characters

GTO Higher Ups

The current Bureau Chief of the GTO (her name is French for "winter"). Hiver is the reincarnation of Pfeilspitze (Mercredi). She has shown the ability to travel through a dimensional door, which explains how she always seems to appear out of nowhere.
 

Chief Hiver's secretary. He appears to be very close to Hiver where he is rarely (if ever) away from her side. His name is German for "summer". Sommer is the reincarnation of Armbrust.

ES Members

 Trixie was a skilled, energetic ES member, whom both Ascoeur and Q-feuille greatly admired. It was revealed that she could teleport like Ascoeur, however she was able to carry people and objects, something Ascoeur cannot currently achieve unless "powered up" by Di-air. Trixie was also able to deflect attacks by bending space around her. She is partners with Troisienne.  Her unexpected death had a great impact upon Ascoeur and Q-feuille, as well as representing a change in tone for the series.  On Trixie's tombstone is written Trixie III Éclair, when it is later revealed in episode 18 that Eclipse, the former GTO director, had attempted to clone Éclair and Lumière using her quantum abilities and that Trixie was the third generation of Éclair with her predecessors being Uniear and Duerry.

Troisienne was the quieter, more composed of the two but equally admired by both Ascoeur and Q-feuille, although arguably closer to the latter due to her otaku tendencies (which after revealing they are clones of each other suggests that it is hereditary). Her ability allowed her to literally stop time, but she was only able to do this a few times before becoming fatigued as it produced a great strain on her body. Like Trixie, her sudden and violent death had a great impact upon Ascoeur and Q-feuille, as well as representing a change in tone for the series.  On Troisienne's tombstone is written Troisienne III Lumière, like Trixie, Troisienne was clone of Lumière created by Eclipse and is the third generation of Lumière with her predecessors being Uni-ace and Dionie.

She is seen in the prologue of the first episode, saving a planet from destruction. It is revealed she did so by freezing it and the surrounding space in time.  It is later revealed in episode 18 that Eclipse had attempted to clone Éclair with her quantum abilities, she made three generations of clones (including Trixie) but died before making a fourth. She finally makes an appearance in episode 22, when the Space Time was removed by Geacht'er. After the universe was saved, they returned to the GTO as what appears to be receptionists. Despite Ascoeur not being her clone, they are similar in many ways from ability to personal quirks.

Lumière is the partner of Éclair.  She is also seen in the prologue saving a planet from destruction. It is revealed she did so by freezing it and the surrounding space in time.  It is later revealed that Eclipse had attempted to clone Lumière and made three generations of clones, the third being Troisienne and the fourth later revealed to be Q-feuille. She finally makes an appearance in episode 22, when the Space Time was removed by Geacht'er. After the universe was saved, they returned to the GTO as what appears to be receptionists.

Tweedledee is an ES member from the previous series, though appears to not have aged. It is revealed that in training, Ascoeur was assigned to her and her partner, Tweedledum. She is very competitive and has a strong sense of pride, as is shown when Ascoeur and Q-feuille infiltrated a booby-trapped GTO headquarters at night, and Tweedledee took it as a chance to test out the new intruder system. Tweedledee has the ability to control electricity and can create an effect similar to Lumière's "Puppet". She is able to communicate and even exchange bodies with her brother over great distances using an advanced form of twin telepathy.

Tweedledum is an ES member from the previous series, and twin brother of Tweedledee. He is the calmer of the two, though has a sister complex and a malicious streak. He seems to dislike Ascoeur, most likely due to jealousy over his sister's attention from when Ascoeur was assigned to them for training. Tweedledum has the ability to control the magnetic fields around him, combining with Tweedledee to create a powerful gravitational force.

Un-ou is an ES member from the previous series. He and A-ou are first seen in the prologue of the first episode, however only mentioned briefly before appearing in episode 7. Un-ou is the energetic, malicious of the two, balancing out his partner's quiet personality. It is revealed that in training, Q-feuille was assigned to Un-ou and A-ou. Un-ou's "Amazing" ability allows him to listen to the various life energies which allow them to track down their enemies. Though he is a guy, he has a penchant for dressing in women's clothing. He is also called tsundere by others.

A-ou is an ES member from the previous series, and partner of Un-ou. The older and more stoic member of the duo, A-ou (unlike his partner) has a stronger sense of honor and justice. He is also more of a pacifist and he often speaks in a profound and meaningful manner, giving him a rather preachy presence among other people. His ability, "Amplifier" gives him the ability to improve his visual perception tenfold, as well as to see the light of people's lives and how that dims when they die. He also uses the energy seen by Un-ou to increase the power of his physical attacks.

Others

Mi Nourose is the very masculine looking chief of "Touch & Go!", the café Ascoeur, Q-feuille and Di-air work in, as well as the head of the dormitory. Mi Nourose has a penchant for cosplay, and is always seen in a different outfit. At the end of episode 24, Mi Nourose is revealed to be someone of importance as he's seen on top of a ship and has knowledge of the space-frozen time.

One of the GTO receptionists, and frequent customer of "Touch & Go!"  Alisa has quite a lively spirit and is a keen follower of dramas and yaoi.

One of the GTO receptionists, and frequent customer of "Touch & Go!"  Belle often speaks common sense when things get out of hand.

He revisits the planet every year where his mother is trapped in Frozen Space Time, leaving a wreath for her. At the end of the series he finally was reunited with Éclair.

Antagonists

G Society
G Society is a terrorist organization that claims themselves to be a nation.  However, they are composed of descendants of the corrupt Nouvelesse (people who are desendences from Mother Earth) whom GTO (then GOTT) removed from power thanks to Éclair and Lumière. These people want revenge and are led by the mysterious Geacht'er, the self-proclaimed only pure-blood Nouvelesse. They also show no care for their own members, regarding the dead body of a man who voice disbelief towards Geacht'er as trash. Despite this they have considerable power over the universe's government, which lead to the temporary suspension of the GTO. Their Shadow Workers are ability-users who enforce their standards, mostly commoners with the exception of Letuchaia and Pauki, though none of the teams trust the other.

Geacht'er is the leader and founder of G Society whose goal is to dismantle the GTO. He projects a message to Aineias claiming that the GTO are corrupt and that his G Society will bring peace to the galaxy.  His ability is to plant deadly roses onto targets.  These roses are white before turning red while the victim is dying.  After the death, the rose then turns black. He has also inherited the ability to manipulate time. Many of the G Society believe he is not who he claims to be, but are too scared to voice their thoughts aloud. It is later revealed he was the one who caused the incident 25 years ago, trying to destroy the universe and since then has created the G Society. It is later revealed he has done all of this in an attempt to destroy the universe again, though it is unknown if he used the Nouvelesse's hope to regain their title for his own gain. In episode 15, Geacht'er reveals to Ascoeur that she is his sister Liselotte and that his real name is Alfred, given that they share the same rose birthmark. Since then he seems to have become obsessed to have his little sister with him (which appears to border on an incestuous desire), something that has caused noticeable jealousy with his more devoted Shadow Workers like Saphir, Shade and Letuchaia. Despite his polite and kind personality, he is able to kill anyone in his way without a second thought. Also an interesting note, his most loyal Shadow Workers were the ones who were conscious when he saved them, as well as coming to their aid just when they needed him the most. He claims he has always been alone since his sister disappeared, and has shown to not hesitate to try to kill anyone who is no longer of use to him, this including his own followers or even rigging the G Society ship to explode, killing all 50,000 people on board (including Pauki and Letuchaia's grandmother) if Ascoeur didn't follow his plan.

Team 1
Composed of Saphir and Rubis who worked with the Royal Guard as assassins during when the Nobility ruled. However, after the GOTT made the universe a democracy they were imprisoned for 50 years before being sentenced to death. It was then where Geacht'er saved them. However, the universe became a democracy only 25 years ago, the time difference has yet to be explained.

Saphir is a Shadow Worker of G-society, first appearing in episode 4 along with her partner, Rubis. Her ability allows her to create ice at will for attack and defense. Though she is the calmer of the two of her team, she can become very angry if someone insults Geacht'er. Despite her well manners she is a complete slob at home. She is also dating an unnamed man. She is given the nick-name "Ice-maiden."  Saphir becomes one of the chief antagonists later on, as her loyalty to Geacht'er is so strong that she would even attack her partner Rubis to serve him when she now believes her to be a traitor. Her personality is later no longer the calm cold it once was, as now the plan is near completion she has shown another side, a sadistic love of war and death, seeming to be the only one from the very start of the three teams to know that the removal of Time Space will destroy the universe, and finds joy that all the "stupid people" will die and the chosen few will survive. This personality has even scared her former partner. She appears to have died when she fell into the energy filled planet.

Rubis is a Shadow worker of G-society, first appearing in episode 4 with her partner Saphir, despite the fact she doesn't like cold temperatures. Her ability allows her to transform into a powerful feral form with extending claws. She also is immune to poison. She is given the nickname "Beast woman". After seeing the lengths Geacht'er would go without any remorse, she appears to have change sides and repeatedly helps Q-feuille's and Di-Air out. She is last seen in a hospital with a cast.

Team 2
Consisting of Torch and Shade, both who possess powers revolving around illusions. They used to be GTO ES Members before betraying them to join the G Society, however this was revealed to because of their corrupt director, who ordered to have them killed to cover up his corruption. They also have a habit of using their powers to become invisible and spy on girls. They are currently acting as Q-feuille's bodyguards while she is brainwashed into believing she is Geacht'er's little sister.

Torch is a Shadow Worker of G-society, first appearing in episode 7 when he attacks Q-feuille, Trixie and Di-air. He uses "Illusions", attacking the three from a distance but making it appear as though he was right in front of them.  Torch is very loyal to his partner Shade and has complete trust in him.  It was later revealed that Torch and Shade were former ES members themselves before defecting to G Society. He is well known to be a womanizer, stating he likes to have a woman's company in bed. In episode 19 it is revealed that both Torch and Shade were in the police force and when they wanted to kill off Shade, Torch stayed with him and did not abandon him.  In episode 19, even after Geacht'er brainwashed Torch asked him to kill Shade, Shade would rather kill himself as he does not like the idea of having partners fight each other. He is later attacked by Geacht'er when he disobeyed his order by the use of one of his roses, but is later revealed to have survived.

Shade is the partner of Torch, his abilities being similar, the only difference is that his illusions are implanted in the minds of his targets, giving the victim's eyes a purple and green color when under the effects. He is also able to read minds as well as brainwash people. He attacks Ascoeur and Troisienne, and seems to sees something special in Ascoeur. He apparently has somewhat of a rivalry with Saphir as shown in episode 11, most likely with their devotion towards Geacht'er, where they scowl at each other passing in the hall and Saphir causes to freeze part of the hall. In episode 19 it is revealed that both Torch and Shade were in the police force; when Shade learned something that could endanger both of them, he refused to tell Torch to prevent him from getting involved.  When Torch asked Shade would comply to Lord Geacht'er's request to kill Torch, Shade does not answer him; the Geacht'er does give the order, Shade refused.  He later goes after Torch when he is falling out of the space station, though used his powers on Geacht'er before doing so. He is later seen with Torch living a normal life.  Shade also shares the same voice actor as Sinistra from the Kiddy Grade.

Team 3
Consisting of Letuchaia and Pauki, two young children. They are the only Nouvelesse Shadow Workers. They are cousins working as Shadow Workers as their service allows their grandmother to get high quality medical treatment.

Letuchaia, whose name comes from the Russian for bat (where her shoes even have bat wings on them as well as a crest on her chest), is known as the "princess" of G Society and has a habit of using multiplication to express her feelings (I am 8 times more annoyed and so on).  She acts all posh and snobbish and shows respect to only Geacht'er. She has a grudge against the GTO and its actions because her Nouvelesse grandparents were thrown out onto the streets. However, she has becomes extremely jealous over the fact that Q-feuille has taken her "little sister" position to Geacht'er, leading her to try to get rid of her. Her ability, Crazy Cracker, is to eject energy bolas from her fingers. She is Pauki's cousin. However, her loyalty to Geacht'er has seemed to have vanished after discovering the removal of Time Space was not going to be used for peace, and in fact used to destroy the universe, along with making sure Ascoeur  followed his orders by threatening the lives of everyone on G Society, including her grandmother.
 

Pauki, whose name is Russian for spiders (wearing a crest of a spider on his chest), is known as Letuchaia's "knight" and has the same ability as Letuchaia. He is very loyal to Letuchaia to an obsessive degree, highly suggesting he is in love with her. He also has a habit of answering Letuchaia's rhetorical questions, which causes her to scold him. He is Letuchaia's cousin. He later sides with the GTO along with his cousin, and seems to have gained a crush on Tweedledee.

Others

Shape-shifting nanomachines originally developed by the labs at the GOTT, now used as weapons by terrorists. Traces of the technology litter the abandoned GOTT headquarters.

A secretive maid who first appears in episode 8, she is given special glasses from Letuchaia to spy on the other G Society ES Members and give the information to Geacht'er. Core share a voice actress with Kiddy Grade's Bonita.  Whether this means anything or not remains unconfirmed.

Grandma
Letuchaia's Nouvelesse grandmother, she is sick with a currently unnamed illness and is currently residing at a hospital which she was able to get thanks to her grandchildren becoming Shadow Workers.

References

Kiddy Girl-and